Buck Prairie Township is an inactive township in Lawrence County, in the U.S. state of Missouri.

Buck Prairie Township took its name from a prairie of the same name, which was named after an early citizen with the surname Buck.

References

Townships in Missouri
Townships in Lawrence County, Missouri